The Last Sessions is a compilation album by American country music artist, Patsy Cline. The album was released in 1988 under MCA Records and was produced by Owen Bradley. The album was a collection material Cline had recorded during her last recording sessions for Decca Records in early 1963.

Background 
The album contains ten of twelve total tracks of material Cline had recorded between February 4–7, 1963, shortly before her death in a plane crash a month later. The album contained the major hit, "Sweet Dreams", which would peak at #4 on the Billboard Magazine Hot Country Songs chart and #44 on the Billboard Pop Chart after her death March 5, 1963. "He Called Me Baby" would also be issued as a single, peaking at #23 on the Billboard Country Chart in 1964. The Last Sessions primarily included a series of Pop standards from the 1940s and 1950s. Songs such as Irving Berlin's "Always" and Pat Boone's "Love Letters in the Sand" were recorded in February. Four country music standards are also featured, such as Bill Monroe's "Blue Moon of Kentucky" and Ray Price's "Crazy Arms."

The material was originally released along with B-sides and other previously-unreleased tracks across three posthumous studio albums The Patsy Cline Story (June, 1963), A Portrait of Patsy Cline (June, 1964) and That's How a Heartache Begins (Nov. 1964). The tracks on this release, save for Faded Love  and I'll Sail My Ship Alone which were omitted, are presented in their original production order, as the album was never programmed as a cohesive unit as originally planned.

The album was remastered and was transferred digitally by Glenn Meadows, Milan Bogdan, Jim Loyd and Benny Quinn at Masterfonics. and is available on vinyl, cassette and CD,

The album was given three out of five stars by allmusic.

Track listing 

Two tracks from the sessions - the first track recorded on February 4 (Faded Love) and the last track recorded on February 7 (I'll Sail My Ship Alone) do not appear in this compilation.

Personnel

Musical 
 Harold Bradley — electric bass
 Owen Bradley — producer
 Patsy Cline — lead vocals
 Floyd Cramer — piano
 Ray Edenton — rhythm guitar
 Buddy Harman — drums
 Randy Hughes — rhythm guitar
 Joe Jenkins — acoustic bass
 The Jordanaires — background vocals
 Grady Martin — electric guitar
 Bill Pursell — vibraphone

Technical 
 Milan Bogodan — remastering, tape preparation
 Jerry Joyner — design
 Simon Levy — art direction
 Jim Lloyd — remastering
 Michael Ochs — photography
 Jay Orr — liner notes
 Benny Quinn — remastering, tape preparation
 Don Roy — liner notes
 Virginia Team — art direction

References 

1988 compilation albums
Patsy Cline albums
Albums produced by Owen Bradley
MCA Records albums